Louis "Leibele" Waldman (June 22, 1907 – August 28, 1969)  was a Jewish cantor (“chazzan”), composer and actor, the only American born cantor who may be considered as belonging to the great cantors of the so-called "golden age of jewish cantorial music".

Biography 
Louis Waldman born to a family of Jewish Galician immigrants living in the Lower East Side of New York City. Early on he was recognized as a "wunderkind", officiating at the pulpit with a choir by the age of nine. He studied with local musician Shabtai Weingarten. Referred to by his affectionately diminutive Yiddish name "Leibele", Waldman was the choir leader in the Wayne Street Synagogue of Jersey City (1924),  the Livonia Street Synagogue of Brownsville (1925), the Flatbush Jewish Center (1925–26, with Cantor Samuel Katzman) and in the Galician Synagogue of Passaic in 1927.

In 1928 he assumed his first adult cantorial position, officiating on the High Holidays at the Beth Israel Synagogue on Columbia Street in Cambridge, Mass. In 1929 Waldman became the cantor of Temple Emanuel of Passaic, where he remained until 1934. Waldman then served one year at the Mount Eden Jewish Center in the Bronx.

At this point in his career,  Waldman elected not to accept full-time cantorial positions, instead working on the High Holidays in many prominent venues, including Hunt's Point Palace (1936 and 1937), the Bronx Winter Garden (1938), the Concord Hotel and Grossinger's Catskill Resort Hotel in the Catskill Mountains (New York), Laurel In The Pines in Lakewood (New Jersey) and The Breakers (New Jersey).

In addition to singing in the synagogue, Waldman developed an extensive film career, appearing in a dozen motion pictures, including “The Voice of Israel” where he appeared with world famous cantors Yossele Rosenblatt, Mordechai Herschman, and David Roitman.  In addition he began to develop a radio career, singing for over a quarter of a century on the airwaves, appearing on stations WTBS, WMCA and WEVD, the station of the Forward Association.

During WWII, Waldman sang for Jewish troops stationed all over the United States. The Smithsonian Institution has preserved recordings of Waldman singing “Ich Dank Dir Gott far America” (I Thank You G-d for America), and the other was “Venn Di Zihn Vellen Kommen Tzurick” (When Your Son Will Come Back From the War). He also performed for many Jewish organizations, including  Israel Bonds, the Jewish National Fund (JNF), and the Anti-Defamation League.

Waldman initiated a series of recordings, produced by Moses Asch, and issued on his label, ASCH Records. Waldman later recorded for Stinson, Disc, Banner, and following the second world war, RCA Victor. In the 1950s Waldman recorded for ABC and later for a private label, MALOH Records. During most of these years, he recorded with Oscar Julius as his conductor and Abraham Ellstein as his accompanist.

While still a young man, Waldman concertized with the renowned cantor Zavel Kwartin (in his eighties at the time) and Yossele Rosenblatt. In fact, Rosenblatt shared the stage with Waldman during his final concert in the United States before his death in Palestine in 1933.

Leibele Waldman died on August 28, 1969, two months past his 62nd birthday, and was buried at Beth David cemetery, Long Island, New York.

Legacy
In the words of Waldman's son Harvey:

Filmography
	1950 Yiddish Comedy Sketches
	1941 Mazel Tov, Jews
	1940 Motel, the Operator
	1939 Kol Nidre
	1937 I Want to Be a Mother
	1936 Liebe und Leidenschaft [Love and Sacrifice]
       1933 The Eternal Jew a/k/a Avrum Ovenu [Father Abraham] or Abraham Our Patriarch
	1931 A Cantor on Trial  (Waldman plays multiple roles in this spoof of a synagogue committee in search of a chazan for the High Holiday services)

Autobiography
Waldman published his autobiography, entitled Song Divine, in 1941.

Footnotes

External links
The Official Leibele Waldman blog
Songs performed by Waldman
Recordings by Waldman at the archives of Florida Atlantic University
Song Divine, Waldman's autobiography

1907 births
1969 deaths
Hazzans
Performers of religious music
Jewish American composers
20th-century American composers
20th-century American singers
People from the Lower East Side
Burials at Beth David Cemetery
20th-century American Jews